Kekkai may refer to:

 , a word of Buddhist origin, commonly used in modern fiction to refer to a protective spiritual or magical force field
 A form of sankai, or birth yōkai

See also
 Kekkai Sensen, a Japanese manga series
 Kekkaishi, a Japanese manga series